Yusuf is a common name in the Muslim world, equivalent to the English name Joseph and the Hebrew name Yossef. Another Arabic variant is Youssif.

Yusuf may also refer to:

Islamic view of Joseph
Yusuf (sura), 12th sura of the Qur'an
Yusuf and Zulaikha, poetry about Joseph and the wife of Potiphar
Yusuf, the stage name (since 2006) of the singer-songwriter Yusuf Islam, who was formerly known as Cat Stevens